Patryk Czarnowski, (born 1 November 1985) is a Polish former volleyball player. He was part of the Polish national team in 2010–2011, silver medallist at the 2011 World Cup, three–time Polish Champion (2016, 2017, 2018).

Personal life
Czarnowski was born in Ostróda, Poland. He has brother Dariusz. He graduated School of Sports Championship in Spała. He studied pedagogy at the Warmian-Masurian University in Olsztyn. On August 1, 2013 his girlfriend Jagoda gave birth to their son Michał. He is married to Jagoda (née Majewska).

Career

Clubs
In 2012 he came back to Jastrzębski Węgiel. In season 2012/3013 Czarnowaki won the bronze medal of Polish Championship. In 2013/2014 the club advanced to the Final Four of the Champions League in Ankara and after defeating VC Zenit Kazan won the bronze medal. His team beat ZAKSA Kędzierzyn-Koźle in the last matches in the fight for a medal. Jastrzębski Węgiel ended season with second bronze, this time of Polish Championship. In season 2016/17 was a member of team ZAKSA Kędzierzyn-Koźle. In May 2017 ZAKSA, including Czarnowski, defended title of Polish Champion. Also in May 2017 it was announced that Czarnowski moved to another Polish club PGE Skra Bełchatów.

National team
Patryk Czarnowski was first appointed to represent the Polish national team by coach Daniel Castellani in 2010. He representing Poland on World Championship 2010. He debuted in Polish national team on May 29, 2010 in a  friendly match with France. He won the silver medal of World Cup 2011.

Sporting achievements

Clubs
 CEV Cup
  2010/2011 – with ZAKSA Kędzierzyn-Koźle
 CEV Challenge Cup
  2008/2009 – with Jastrzębski Węgiel
 National championships
 2009/2010  Polish Cup, with Jastrzębski Węgiel
 2015/2016  Polish Championship, with ZAKSA Kędzierzyn-Koźle
 2016/2017  Polish Cup, with ZAKSA Kędzierzyn-Koźle
 2016/2017  Polish Championship, with ZAKSA Kędzierzyn-Koźle
 2017/2018  Polish SuperCup, with PGE Skra Bełchatów
 2017/2018  Polish Championship, with PGE Skra Bełchatów
 2018/2019  Polish SuperCup, with PGE Skra Bełchatów

Youth national team
 2003  European Youth Olympic Festival
 2005  CEV U19 European Championship

Individual awards
 2010: Polish Cup – Best Blocker

References

External links

 
 Player profile at PlusLiga.pl
 Player profile at Volleybox.net

1985 births
Living people
People from Ostróda
Polish men's volleyball players
AZS Olsztyn players
Jastrzębski Węgiel players
ZAKSA Kędzierzyn-Koźle players
Skra Bełchatów players
Warta Zawiercie players
Middle blockers